An awards program sponsored by Princeton University and principally undertaken by its alumni, the Princeton Prize in Race Relations honors high school age students who have done notable work in advancing the cause of race relations. The mission of the Princeton Prize is “To promote harmony, respect, and understanding among people of different races by identifying and recognizing high school age students whose efforts have had a significant, positive effect on race relations in their schools or communities.” By recognizing, rewarding, and reinforcing the good work of students who are making a difference, the Princeton Prize hopes to promote better race relations now and to provide an impetus for other young people to work towards racial understanding in the future.

The Princeton Prize was initiated in the 2003/04 academic year, with pilot programs in the Boston and Washington, D.C. metropolitan areas. The program has grown dramatically since that time and is now nationwide. In the 2008/2009 academic year the Princeton Prize will be offered in 23 regions across the United States. It is hoped that the Princeton Prize will ultimately evolve into a nationally recognized awards program to which any high school age student in the country can apply.

The Princeton Prize in Race Relations, together with a cash award of up to $1,000, is offered to those applicants doing the best work in each locale. In addition, other worthy applicants are honored with “Certificates of Accomplishment.” All honorees are recognized at their schools’ awards assemblies and at area-wide recognition events.

The Princeton Prize in Race Relations is overseen by a national board consisting primarily of Princeton alumni, but also comprising Princeton University staff members and current undergraduates. The Princeton Prize Board is a committee of the Alumni Association of Princeton University, the umbrella organization for all of Princeton's alumni activities. In addition, a local committee is established in each region where the Princeton Prize operates. These committees consist primarily – though not exclusively – of Princeton alumni.

Other local committee members may include educators and other individuals who are involved in race related matters in their communities. The local committees operate under the aegis of the Princeton alumni club or association in each area. Four past honorees, and current Princeton University students, currently sit on the National Board: Anna Liebowitz '09, Robbie Edmiston '11, Josh Miller '12, and Allen Williams '12.

References

External links
 Princeton Prize in Race Relations

Multiracial affairs in the United States